In the 19th century, a driving club was a membership club for the recreational practice of carriage driving.

Early British driving clubs

The B.D.C. 
One of the first driving clubs was the Bensington Driving Club, founded in February 1807 at Bensington, Oxfordshire, also known as the Benson Driving Club when Bensington became Benson, and commonly referred to as "the B.D.C.".  It was disbanded in 1854.  The BDC initially met in the White Hart public house.  Later the club was relocated to Bedfont, becoming the Bedfont Driving Club with ease (since the initials remained the same), and met in the Black Dog public house.  As a consequence it was also known by the informal name the Black and White Club.

Its first president was Charles Finch.  Finch's successor as president was Thomas Onslow, 2nd Earl of Onslow, a.k.a. "Tommy" Onslow.  The members of the club were illustrated in Holcroft's comedy The Road to Ruin in Goldfinch.  Tommy Onslow was ridiculed in two epigrams, the first of which was:

The second was a variation:

In fact, these were variants of a rhyme that had followed Onslow from his days as a "whip" long before the founding of the Four-In-Hand Club, where he had driven a phaeton.  In Athenaeum one correspondent reported that the verse had been popular in Onslow's younger days, in Surrey, at the start of the 19th century:

The Four Horse Club 
The (friendly) rival Four Horse Club was founded the year after the BDC, in April 1808, but didn't last as long.  It was founded because the membership of the BDC was limited to 25 people.  Charles Buxton, the inventor of the Buxton bit, along with some friends therefore founded the Four Horse Club.  It was also informally known by various other names, as the Four-In-Hand Club (after four-in-hand), the Whip Club, and the Barouche Club.  The third name was after a type of horse carriage called a barouche, which was driven by its members.  The club rules dictated that a barouche should have silver mounted harnesses, rosettes at their heads, yellow bodies, "dickies", and bay horses.  However, the final requirement was relaxed.  Club members Sir Henry Peyton and Mr Annesley drove roan horses.

The Four Horse Club rules also had strict dictates about clothing for the drivers.  They required a drab coat that reached down to one's ankles, decorated with large mother-of-pearl buttons, and three tiers of pockets; a blue waistcoat with inch-wide yellow stripes; knee-length breeches with strings and rosettes, made of plush; and a hat that was at least 3.5 inch deep in the crown. The Club regularly drove as a group to Salt Hill, where they spent a convivial evening and the night, before driving back to London.

The FHC encountered difficulties in 1820, revived in 1822 with slightly different club rules, but only lasting until 1826.  An 1820 joke went the rounds, of a person addressing a FHC member, saying "I hear that you men have broken up.".  To which, the reply was "No.  We've broken down; the FHC had not enough in hand to keep on with."  The modified rules called for a brown landaulet carriage, without ornaments; no restrictions upon horse colour; and brass mounted harnesses.

The Richmond Driving Club 
The Richmond Driving Club was founded in 1838 by Lord Chesterfield.  It only lasted until 1845.  It used to meet at Lord Chesterfield's house, and drive, in procession, to dinner at the Castle Hotel in Richmond.  It was satirized by Robert Smith Surtees:

The Duke of Beaufort, named in the poem, did take part in the processions, but was not actually a member of the RDC.  Mr Angerstein, also named, was a particularly reckless driver, whose reputation led no-one to want to ride with him.  An anecdote relates that on one occasion someone unwittingly climbed into Angerstein's carriage after dinner for the ride home.  Angerstein, so excited that someone had actually chosen to ride with him, set off immediately, without waiting for the rest of the procession, and so suddenly that his passenger was thrown head-over-heels.  The passenger, realizing whose carriage he had embarked upon, saying nothing jumped straight off.

The Four-In-Hand Driving Club 
The Four-In-Hand Driving Club was founded in 1856.

Driving clubs in the United States

19th century popularity 
Enthusiasts in Boston, Massachusetts formed several driving clubs (also called "gentlemen's driving clubs"), and so-called trotting associations, in the second half of the 19th century.  They would race in three locations: the Readville Race Course, the Riverside Riding Park in Allston (later to be named Beacon Park), and the South End Driving Park.  The most famous of these clubs, the Metropolitan Driving Club, conducted races for several decades, until the rise in popularity of the motor car caused carriage driving to lose its appeal.

20th and 21st century 
A 2002 estimate by the USTA was that there were over 500 members of the various registered driving clubs in the United States.  Most of these driving clubs are small, holding driving contests at the home tracks before the regular horse races on the racing card. There are additional organizations dedicated to the sport of combined driving. Still others focus on the driving of draft horses and other non-racing breeds for primarily recreational purposes.

References

Reference bibliography

Further reading 
 
 
 

Horse driving
Clubs and societies